Qataraspis (meaning "Qatar shield") is an extinct genus of primitive arthrodire placoderm from the Late? Devonian of Qatar. The type species is Q. deprofundis.

Discovery and naming
The holotype was sent to England to be studied and Qataraspis deprofundis was named and described by White (1969).

Casts of the holotype also exist, under specimen numbers PV P 75116 and PV P 75117.

Classification
White (1969) classified Qataraspis as a basal member of the Arthrodira. This classification was followed through by Denison (1978) in a review of the Placodermi, where it was placed in the Arctolepididae.

References

Late Devonian first appearances
Late Devonian animals
Fossil taxa described in 1969